The 1963–64 Washington Huskies men's basketball team represented the University of Washington for the 1963–64 NCAA University Division basketball season. Led by first-year head coach Mac Duckworth, the Huskies were members of the Athletic Association of Western Universities (Big Six) and played their home games on campus at Hec Edmundson Pavilion in Seattle, Washington.

Athletic director Jim Owens promoted Duckworth to head coach in April 1963, and led the Huskies for five years. He was previously an assistant at Washington for three seasons under John Grayson.

References

External links
Sports Reference – Washington Huskies: 1963–64 basketball season

Washington Huskies men's basketball seasons
Washington Huskies
Washington
Washington